An expatriate Irish population in any country other than Ireland or Northern Ireland is generally considered to be Irish emigrants and their descendants, at least to the extent that the people involved are aware of their Irish heritage and willing to acknowledge it. This definition applies to over 80 million people, considerably more than the 3 million of Irish nationality who reside in other countries. This smaller group is defined by the government of Ireland in legal terms as those of Irish nationality who habitually reside outside of the island of Ireland. It includes Irish citizens who have emigrated abroad and their children, who are Irish citizens by descent under Irish law. It also includes their grandchildren in cases where they were registered as Irish citizens in the Foreign Births Register held in every Irish diplomatic mission.

The main article Irish diaspora contains details of most expatriate Irish populations, and provides links to main articles about many of them. This article presents those links, and some others, in tabular form arranged alphabetically by country.

Details

References

Expatriate populations
Irish diaspora